Monica Kathleen Rutherford (born 29 March 1944) is a retired artistic gymnast from England. She competed at the 1964 Summer Olympics in all artistic gymnastics events with the best ranking of 59th on the vault.

After marrying Brian Phelps, an Olympic diver, she changed her last name to Phelps.

Following her career as a gymnast, Rutherford successfully coached for many years at the OLGA club in Poole, Dorset. She has since retired and, now resides in France.

References

1944 births
Living people
Sportspeople from Sunderland
Gymnasts at the 1964 Summer Olympics
Olympic gymnasts of Great Britain
British female artistic gymnasts